Mount Battock (778 m) is a mountain in the Mounth on the eastern edge of the Scottish Highlands, on the border between Aberdeenshire and Angus.

A rounded peak, it is located on the northern side of Glen Esk, and is the most easterly Corbett, also making it the most easterly mountain in Scotland. The nearest settlement is Tarfside.

References

Mountains and hills of Aberdeenshire
Mountains and hills of Angus, Scotland
Marilyns of Scotland
Corbetts